is a Japanese actress, voice actress and J-pop singer from Sasebo, Nagasaki. She is represented by Space Craft Entertainment.

Biography
Yūka Nanri debuted on NHK's  (an educational programme) in 1995 as a child star.

In 1997, she joined , a stage group for young girls as one of its seventh generation members, and acted in musicals and other theatrical performances.

Nanri left the group in August 2001 and made her voice acting debut that year as Bubbles in the Japanese version of The Powerpuff Girls. After that, she officially started her voice acting activities as the protagonist of Gunslinger Girl. She has voiced many weak-looking and gentle characters, though in My-HiME she played Nao Yūki, a morally ambivalent middle school student who enjoys preying on perverted men.

In late 2003 Nanri formed tiaraway, a voice acting duo with fellow Japanese singer Saeko Chiba. After releasing three singles and an album tiaraway disbanded on March 6, 2005, after its first (and final) live concert. Nanri and Chiba cited wanting to go down separate paths as the reason for ending the group.

In 2006 Nanri was asked to voice Karen Ichijō from the second season of the anime School Rumble, but she turned it down to play the main character of the musical , and participated in four performances from April 13–16. She graduated from university in March of the same year with an academic degree in vocal music.

Nanri is a currently a vocalist for Yuki Kajiura's "FictionJunction Yuuka" project. She held her first solo concert, entitled Premium Live 2007, as FictionJunction Yuuka in February 2007.

Nanri's first mini-album, "LIVE ON!", was released August 22, 2012.

Filmography

Anime 
 Memories Off 2nd (2001 OVA), Megumi Soma
 The Prince of Tennis (2001 TV series), Narumi Ijuuin (ep 134)
 Macross Zero (2002 OVA), Mao Nome
 Godannar (2003 TV series), Sakura
 Gunslinger Girl (2003 TV series), Henrietta
 My-HiME (2004 TV series), Nao Yūki, Female student (ep 22)
 W~Wish (2004 TV series), Akino Iida
 School Rumble (2004 TV series), Karen Ichijou
 The Place Promised in Our Early Days (2004 film), Sayuri Sawatari
 My-Otome (2005 TV series), Juliet Nao Zhang
 School Rumble: Extra Class (2005 OVA), Karen Ichijou
 My-Otome Zwei (2006 OVA), Juliet Nao Zhang
 Sora Kake Girl (2009 TV series), Nami Shishidō
 Wandering Son (2011 TV series), Saori Chiba
 Corpse Party: Missing Footage (2012 OVA), Mayu Suzumoto 
 Sakamichi no Apollon (2012 TV series), Ritsuko Mukae
 Blood Lad (2013 TV series), Liz T. Blood
 Corpse Party: Tortured Souls (2013 OVA), Mayu Suzumoto
 Space Dandy (2014 TV series), Queen Bee Sofia
 Ushio and Tora (2015 TV series), Saya Takatori

Drama CDs
 7 Seeds (2003), Natsu Iwashimizu
 Mai-HiME (2005), Nao Yūki
 Mai-Otome (2005), Juliet Nao Zhang

Games
 Memories Off 2nd (2001), Megumi Sōma, Nozomi Sōma
 W~Wish (2004), Akino Iida
 D→A:BLACK, Hīro Enomoto
 D→A:WHITE, Hīro Enomoto
 Memories Off After Rain Vol.2 (2005), Megumi Sōma
 My-HiME ~Unmei no Keitōju~ (2005), Nao Yūki
 Musashi: Samurai Legend (2005), Tamie
 Corpse Party BloodCovered: ...Repeated Fear (2010), Mayu Suzumoto
 Corpse Party: Book of Shadows (2011), Mayu Suzumoto
 Corpse Party 2U (2012), Mayu Suzumoto

Musicals
  , Lucy
 big
 FUNK-a-STEP
 FUNK-a-STEP2
 
 
 , Satsuki Katayama
 , Akane Saitō
 , Momoko
  (2006), Yuri

Dubbing

Live-action 
 Bella Martha, Lina Klein (Maxime Foerste)

Animation 
 The Powerpuff Girls (1998), Bubbles
 Frankenweenie (2012), Elsa Van Helsing

Songs 
  cover (2011), in album HARVEST

Discography
 tiaraway releases
 FictionJunction releases
 FictionJunction YUUKA releases

Albums
[2012.03.14] Rondo... Tsuki no Kioku wo Tadotte. (ロンド...月の記憶をたどって。)

Mini-albums
[2012.08.22] LIVE ON!

Singles

Fun! Fun! ★Fantasy

"Fun! Fun! ★Fantasy" was the 4th theme song for the anime Selfish Fairy Mirumo de Pon.

Track listing

"Fun! Fun! ★Fantasy (instrumental)" 
"Nanairo Mirai (instrumental)"

Charts

Odyssey
"Odyssey" is Nanri's first official single and the opening for the anime Dengeki Gakuen RPG: Cross of Venus. 
Catalog Number
UMCK – 5229

Track listing

"Dear"
"Odyssey (instrumental)" 
"Dear (instrumental)"

Charts

Tsukishirube

"Tsukishirube" was the ending theme for the anime Ookami Kakushi. 
Catalog Number
VTCL – 35084

Track listing

"Tsukishirube (instrumental)" 
"Ame no Sanpomichi (instrumental)"

Charts

Shizuku

"Shizuku" was the ending theme song for .hack//Quantum. 
Catalog Number
VTCL – 35097

Track listing

Vocalists: Yūka Nanri, Takumi Ozawa, Kaori Nishina

"Shizuku (instrumental)" 
"Heart Bible (instrumental)"

Charts

Kiseki

"Kiseki" was the ending theme for the anime Sacred Seven. 
Catalog Number
VTCL – 35115

Track listing

"Kiseki (instrumental)" 
"Anata to Watashi no Uta (instrumental)"

Charts

BLOODY HOLIC

"BLOODY HOLIC" was the ending theme for the anime Blood Lad. 
Catalog Number
VTCL-35156

Track listing
"BLOODY HOLIC"
"snow wind"
"BLOODY HOLIC" (without vocal)
"snow wind" (without vocal)

References

External links
 Official blog 
 Official website 
 
 

1960 births
Living people
People from Sasebo
Voice actresses from Nagasaki Prefecture
Japanese child actresses
Japanese women pop singers
Japanese video game actresses
Japanese voice actresses
Musicians from Nagasaki Prefecture
Anime singers
21st-century Japanese singers
21st-century Japanese women singers